Nanwang is a town in Wenshang County in the prefecture-level city Jining city in Shandong province in China.

The area around Nanwang was the highest point for the historical Grand Canal, and with beginning 1411 the Nanwang water division system was created to control the water flow.

References

Notes

Printed References

Township-level divisions of Shandong
Jining